Village Radio 1XT is a radio station on 1368 kHz AM in the Historic Village, 17th Avenue West, Tauranga, New Zealand which only plays the music of the 20s to 90s, weekdays 8am to 5pm and every weekend. This includes "Specialised" broadcast programs from 4pm to 5pm weekdays covering different genres.  Tauranga Village Radio was opened on 13 April 1984 to commemorate the 21st Anniversary of the City of Tauranga.

The equipment was originally from Radio 1ZD, Tauranga, when it became surplus with their shift to a new location.  The transmitter, loaned to the station from Radio New Zealand was the original 1ZB transmitter when it broadcast from Waterview, Auckland, New Zealand.

The announcers, technicians and support staff at Village Radio are all volunteers. The current station manager is George Stewart. Each announcer prepares his or her own programme, based on the easy listening format of the 1950s to the 1990s, from recordings stored at Tauranga Village Radio.  The record library is extensive with some 120,000 plus tracks of music, 50,000 titles and over 15,000 artists. The tracks are made up of LPs, 45s, 78s and CDs from the 1920s to the 1990s.

The station use to only broadcast on Sundays and public holidays, then in 2004 weekday broadcasts began. A new announcer operated studio was established to save wear and tear on the older control desk (vintage 1953) which uses valves which are hard to come-by and expensive. 

Tauranga Village Radio Museum Incorporated is always on the lookout for new volunteers to help with announcing, panel work, technical support and the general running of the station.

Taurang Village Radio made history in January 2013 by transmitting on equipment designed and built almost 80 years ago. After gathering dust and out of action for 13 years with a burnt out high voltage transformer, the old Collins one kilowatt transmitter had been repaired and tested. George Stewart is one of three former radio technicians who repaired the transmitter. Russ Bain and Neil Walsh worked with George to get the transmitter up and running. It was originally one of four transmitters purchased in 1937 by the National - Commercial Broadcasting Service for use by the four ZB Stations. This one was the original 1ZB Radio Station for Auckland.

When more modern transmitters were installed, the little Collins was installed at Paengaroa (NZ) Transmitting station, near Te Puke,N.Z. as an emergency back-up for 1ZD Tauranga, which began broadcasts in 1961.  It was then installed at Village Radio in 1984. At the time, in 1937, these Collins Transmitters were regarded by radio engineers as the ‘Rolls-Royce’ of broadcasting, with very low distortion and a near perfect flat frequency response.   They were considered superior to equipment made in Australia. Considering its age, it is in quite remarkable condition and still puts out 900 watts of aerial power, as designed.

It is thanks to a grant from the Lotteries Commission (NZ) and the expertise of a team from a Judea transformer rewinding business that the transmitter had been able to get back in operation. 
The station installed a brand new Nautel J1000 solid-state transmitter in June 2017 to be used on a daily basis. This was done to increase reliability and take the pressure off the 1 kW tube-based Toshiba which is now used as a back-up.
The Toshiba is the only one of its kind known to be working in the world.  Village Radio has been unable to track down any others still in operation. It is not clear what happened to the other three transmitters installed in New Zealand.
The Collins 20C has been preserved and is only powered up on special occasions.

Village Radio is non-commercial and its income is derived from donations and sponsored time.  Listeners may support the station by making a donation of their choice, picking out 20 tunes which will be broadcast and they also become a Friend of Village Radio entitling them to participate in functions organized by the Volunteers.

Radio stations in New Zealand
Mass media in Tauranga
Tourist attractions in the Bay of Plenty Region